The Road To Adjustment is a Canadian documentary television miniseries which aired on CBC Television in 1960.

Premise
Episodes concerned challenges faced by the Canadian farming and fishing industries. Keith Russell was the series researcher.

Scheduling
The half-hour series was broadcast on Wednesdays at 10:30 p.m. (Eastern) as follows:

 2 March 1960: "The Old Road", concerned small-scale farming, featuring a panel discussion and a filmed segment of Earle Hooker, a farmer from Quebec
 9 March 1960: "The Detour: The Farmer Has Moved Out", highlighted the need for farmers to develop new areas of business for additional income
 16 March 1960: "The Throughway" concerned modern developments in farming
 23 March 1960: "The Seventh Wave" focused on the Atlantic fishing industry, featuring interview segments with fishermen from Port Bickerton, Nova Scotia

References

External links
 

CBC Television original programming
1960 Canadian television series debuts
1960 Canadian television series endings
1960s Canadian documentary television series